"Iblees Ki Majlis-e-Shura" is an Urdu poem written by Muhammad Iqbal in 1935. It describes the meeting of the Devil and his advisers, and they discuss the current situation of the world. It was described as "a scathing criticism of the major socio-political and economic systems offered by the West."

Structure
The poem is written as a meeting between Iblees (the first of the Devils, or Satans in Islam) and his five advisers. The first chapter starts with the Devil describing his accomplishments in taking over the world. His five advisers then discuss certain threats they conceive to the Devil's plans, which were explained as various aspects of the Western society such as capitalism, the rise of democracy and on the other hand socialism. The Devil completes the chapter by dismissing his advisers' concerns one by one. He completes the poem by speculating on a final threat, which he sees as most critical, the resurgence of Islam.

Translation
The poem has been translated to English by Abdussalam Puthige titled The Devil’s Advisory Council: Iblees ki Majlis-e-Shoora

See also 
 Index of Muhammad Iqbal–related articles

References

External links
The poem in Urdu
An English explanation of the poem in a youtube video
An uncredited English translation 

Urdu-language poems
Muhammad Iqbal
Poetry by Muhammad Iqbal
Fiction about the Devil